Prafulla Kumar Mandal Bangladesh Nationalist Party politician. He was elected a member of parliament from Khulna-1 in February 1996.

Career 
Prafulla Kumar Mandal was elected to parliament from Khulna-1 as a Bangladesh Nationalist Party candidate in 15 February 1996 Bangladeshi general election.

He was defeated from Khulna-1 constituency on 12 June 1996 on the nomination of Bangladesh Nationalist Party.

References 

Possibly living people
People from Khulna District
Bangladesh Nationalist Party politicians
6th Jatiya Sangsad members
Bangladeshi Hindus
Year of birth missing